Abanycha is a genus of longhorn beetles of the subfamily Lamiinae, containing the following species:

 Abanycha bicolor (Gahan, 1889)
 Abanycha bicoloricornis Galileo & Martins, 2009
 Abanycha fasciata Galileo & Martins, 2005
 Abanycha pectoralis Martins & Galileo, 2004 
 Abanycha pulchricollis (Bates, 1885)
 Abanycha sericipennis (Bates, 1885)
 Abanycha urocosmia (Bates, 1881)

References

Hemilophini
Cerambycidae genera